Svyatoy Nos is a rural locality (an inhabited locality) in administrative jurisdiction of the closed administrative-territorial formation of Ostrovnoy in Murmansk Oblast, Russia, located beyond the Arctic Circle on the Kola Peninsula at a height of  above sea level. As of the 2010 Census, its population was 7. It is close to Svyatonossky Gulf, on Cape Svyatoy Nos.

References

Notes

Sources

Official website of Murmansk Oblast. Registry of the Administrative-Territorial Structure of Murmansk Oblast 

Rural localities in Murmansk Oblast